Aviance 

 Aviance (brand), a beauty brand produced by Unilever
 Aviance (horse), a racehorse
 Aviance UK, a defunct British aircraft ground handling agent
 House of Aviance, an American vogue-ball house
 Aviance Records, their record label